Atlus is a Japanese video game developer, publishing company and arcade manufacturer. They are known for Japanese role-playing games internationally, with Megami Tensei being its flagship franchise, as well as Print Club (Purikura) arcade machines in East Asia. Note that this list is only for titles developed, published, and/or owned by the Japanese branch of Atlus. For games published outside of Japan by Atlus USA, visit its respective article.

References

External links
 Official game list 

Atlus